Scheele is a surname of Germanic origin. Notable people with the surname include: 

Carl Wilhelm Scheele (1742–1786), German-Swedish pharmaceutical chemist
George Heinrich Adolf Scheele (1808–1864), German botanist
Karin Scheele (b. 1968), Austrian politician; member of the European Parliament since 1999
Leonard A. Scheele (1907–1993), American physician; Surgeon General of the United States, 1948-56
Nick Scheele (1944–2014), British businessman; chief operating officer of Ford Motor Company
Thomas von Scheele (b. 1969), Swedish table tennis player

See also
Scheele (crater), the lunar impact crater